Robert Marion Berry (born August 27, 1942) is an American politician who was the U.S. representative for  from 1997 to 2011. He is a member of the Democratic Party.

Early life, education and career
Born in Stuttgart, Arkansas, Berry was raised in nearby Bayou Meto, Arkansas County in the Arkansas Delta. The son of a rice farmer, he was encouraged by his parents to work towards a career outside the farm. Moving to Little Rock, he earned a pharmacy degree at the University of Arkansas and then ran a pharmacy for two years. In 1967, he returned to the family business and became a farmer in his own right, harvesting soybeans and rice, establishing a business that he carries on today. The family farm holdings have a reported net worth in excess of $1 million.

He ran and was elected to a position as a city alderman in Gillett, Arkansas in 1976. He was appointed as a member of the Arkansas Soil and Water Conservation Commission by Governor Bill Clinton in 1986, and continued in that role until 1994. In 1993, then President Bill Clinton went on to appoint Berry as a member of the White House Domestic Policy Council (1993–1996) and special assistant to the President for Agricultural Trade and Food Assistance (1993–1996).

U.S. House of Representatives

Committee assignments
Committee on Appropriations
Subcommittee on Energy and Water Development
Subcommittee on Homeland Security
Subcommittee on Transportation, Housing and Urban Development, and Related Agencies
Committee on the Budget

Caucuses
House Democratic Health Care Task Force (Co-Chair)
House Affordable Medicine Task Force (Co-Chair)
Congressional Soybean Caucus (Co-Chair)
New Madrid Working Group (Co-Chair)

Berry has been appointed to the House Appropriations Committee and serves on the Military Construction and Veterans Affairs, Energy and Water, and Transportation subcommittees. He was also chosen by Democratic Leadership to serve as Vice-Chair of the Steering and Policy Committees of the United States House of Representatives and as a member of the Leader's Senior Whip Team.

Berry is a self-described Blue Dog Democrat, and voted against the 2001 tax cuts.

Berry had a seat on the House Appropriations Committee. He co-founded the Democrats' Prescription Drug Task Force and has pursued his interests in health care policy while in the Congress. As one of the three House Democrats that sat on the House–Senate conference committee on the Medicare/prescription drug bill in 2003, he voiced many complaints about the administration's healthcare policies.  Berry voted for the Democratic health care reform bill, HR 3962, during its first House Floor vote.  He has also voted for the Troubled Assets Relief Program and the American Recovery and Reinvestment Act.

He visited Cuba with Blanche Lincoln to promote the removal of the trade embargo to create more markets for Arkansas agricultural products. He drew some controversy when he supported the dumping of nuclear waste from Entergy Corporation reactors into the Arkansas River. Berry also made headlines when he called Rep. Adam Putnam (R-Florida) a "Howdy Doody looking nimrod" while on the House floor.

On October 10, 2002, Marion Berry was among the 81 House Democrats who voted in favor of authorizing the invasion of Iraq.

Berry was the only Democrat to vote against the GIVE Act, an act which could expand the AmeriCorps program.

On March 21, 2010, Berry joined 33 other Democrats and 178 Republicans and voted no on the Patient Protection and Affordable Care Act.

Berry was one of four Democrats to vote against the James Zadroga 9/11 Health and Compensation Act, joining 155 of 159 Republicans, blocking the vote (which needed a 2/3 majority to pass, as it was brought to vote under a motion to suspend rules.)

Political campaigns
Returning to Arkansas in 1996, Berry announced his intention to run for the 1st District being vacated by Blanche Lincoln. With tough opposition from more progressive candidates, Berry narrowly won the primary with 52% of the vote, thanks to aggressive campaigning in the rural areas north of the Mississippi Delta region. In a district that had up to that time never elected a Republican, and with Berry outspending his opponent two-to-one in the general election, attorney Warren Dupwe, he claimed a modest victory (53%–44%) that November. He has declined to run for statewide office, citing health, family responsibilities, and unspecified social issues. However, he enjoyed easy re-election since 1996, carrying the district 67%–33% in 2004, and then running unopposed in 2008, while receiving support from donors and groups also opposing the Barack Obama presidential campaign that year. He decided not to stand for re-election in 2010.

During the 2008 presidential campaign, like most Arkansas Democrats, Berry endorsed U.S. Senator and former First Lady of Arkansas Hillary Clinton for President.

Electoral history

Personal life
Berry resides in Gillett, Arkansas, with his wife Carolyn and identifies as a Methodist.

References

External links
Encyclopedia of Arkansas History & Culture entry
 

1942 births
Living people
People from Stuttgart, Arkansas
Politicians from Arkansas County, Arkansas
Businesspeople from Arkansas
Farmers from Arkansas
Methodists from Arkansas
University of Arkansas alumni
Arkansas city council members
Democratic Party members of the United States House of Representatives from Arkansas
21st-century American politicians
American United Methodists